Softball tournaments have been held at the Pan American Games since 1979.  The men's tournament was discontinued after the 2003 Pan American Games, but made a comeback for the 2015 Pan-American Games.

Men's tournament

Women's tournament

Medal table

References

 
Sports at the Pan American Games
Pan American Games
Pan American Games
Pan American Games